Knut Dahlen (28 September 1922 – 18 March 1999) was a Norwegian footballer. He played in four matches for the Norway national football team from 1946 to 1953. He was also named in Norway's squad for the Group 1 qualification tournament for the 1954 FIFA World Cup.

References

External links
 

1922 births
1999 deaths
Norwegian footballers
Norway international footballers
People from Vestre Toten
Association football forwards
Raufoss IL players